Gaudemunda Sophia of Lithuania (also Gaudimantė; c. 1260 – 1288 or 1313) was the daughter of Traidenis, Grand Duke of Lithuania (c. 1270–1282). In 1279 she married Duke of Masovia Bolesław II (c. 1254–1313) of the Piast dynasty. He was the son of Ziemowit I, Prince of Masovia, and Pereyaslava, daughter of Daniel of Galicia of the Rurik dynasty.

Her husband united the Duchy of Masovia and then divided it between their sons, who were:
Siemowit II
Received the Duchy of Rawa
Trojden I (named after Gaudemunda's father, Traidenis, c. 1285 – 13 March 1341)
Received the Duchy of Czersk and Warsaw
Married his cousin Maria, daughter of George I of Halych
Great-grandfather of Cymburgis of Masovia
Wenceslaus (from his second marriage to Kunigunde of Bohemia)
Received the Duchy of Płock

References
 

1260s births
1288 deaths
13th-century Lithuanian nobility
13th-century Lithuanian women